Gavaneh may refer to:
 Gavaneh, Kermanshah
 Gavaneh-ye Hoseyn, Kurdistan Province
 Gavaneh-ye Sharif, Kurdistan Province